The list of ship launches in 1862 includes a chronological list of some ships launched in 1862.


References

Sources

1862
Ship launches